Ronald Rene Lagueux (born June 30, 1931) is an inactive Senior United States district judge of the United States District Court for the District of Rhode Island.

Education and career

Born in Lewiston, Maine, Lagueux received a Artium Baccalaureus degree from Bowdoin College in 1953 and a Bachelor of Laws from Harvard Law School in 1956. He was in private practice in Providence, Rhode Island from 1956 until 1968. He was an associate justice of the Rhode Island Supreme Court from 1968 to 1986.

Federal judicial service

On January 21, 1986, Lagueux was nominated by President Ronald Reagan to a new seat on the United States District Court for the District of Rhode Island created by 98 Stat. 333. Lagueux was confirmed by the United States Senate on March 3, 1986, and received his commission on March 4, 1986. He served as Chief Judge from 1992 to 1999. He assumed senior status on November 30, 2001.

References

Sources
 

1931 births
20th-century American judges
Bowdoin College alumni
Harvard Law School alumni
Judges of the United States District Court for the District of Rhode Island
Living people
Justices of the Rhode Island Supreme Court
United States district court judges appointed by Ronald Reagan
21st-century American judges